North Fork Fryingpan River is a tributary of the Fryingpan River in Pitkin and Eagle counties in Colorado. The stream flows west from a source in the White River National Forest through Savage Lakes to a confluence with the Fryingpan River.

See also
List of rivers of Colorado

References

Rivers of Colorado
Rivers of Pitkin County, Colorado
Tributaries of the Colorado River in Colorado
Rivers of Eagle County, Colorado